Claudio Coralli (born 1 March 1983) is an Italian footballer who currently plays as a forward for Serie D club Aglianese Calcio 1923.

Club career
He was sold to Pizzighettone in a co-ownership deal.

On 27 August 2019, he joined Serie D club Messina.

Personal life
He is the son of Sandra Coralli and Claudio Coralli Sr.

References

External links
 
 

1983 births
Living people
People from Borgo San Lorenzo
Italian footballers
Association football forwards
Empoli F.C. players
A.S. Pizzighettone players
S.S.D. Lucchese 1905 players
A.S. Cittadella players
A.C. Meda 1913 players
U.S. Cremonese players
Reggina 1914 players
Carrarese Calcio players
U.S. Alessandria Calcio 1912 players
A.C.R. Messina players
Serie A players
Serie B players
Serie C players
Serie D players
Sportspeople from the Metropolitan City of Florence
Footballers from Tuscany